Knock First is an American reality television series in which an adolescent is chosen for a total room makeover by the Knock First crew. The series first aired in the Fall of 2003 on ABC Family.

The premise of the show was to shape the room in which the teenager lives into a space that represents them better.  Teenagers who had been living in the same room since they were toddlers are able to redesign the room according to their desires. The series included four designers: Taniya Nayak, John Gidding, Kathy Kuo, Shane Booth, and two carpenters: Carrie Roy and  Andy Hampton.

The first season of Knock First centered mainly around teenagers in and around the Northeast, whereas the second season expanded to homes in California, to a slightly older audience.

The show theme for the first season was titled "(This Is The Way) I Am", and was written and produced by Widelife, also creators of the theme for Bravo's Queer Eye For The Straight Guy, and performed by Faith Trent.  The show theme for the second season was titled "Bring it to Life," written and performed by Kat Meoz.

The show was supposed to be redesigned for its third season, but was canceled after two seasons instead.

References

External links
 
 

2000s American reality television series
2003 American television series debuts
2004 American television series endings
ABC Family original programming
Home renovation television series